The Gambian High Commissioner in London is the official representative of the Government in Banjul to the Government of the United Kingdom, and is accredited by the Holy See.

History 

In 2012 a proposal was made within the Commonwealth of Nations to address human rights, copyright and political corruption. 
Following the proposal, Kamalesh Sharma, Commonwealth Secretary General, met with Yahya Jammeh and other top officials. 
In late September 2013 the government of Yahya Jammeh realized that the Commonwealth is a neocolonial instrument and left it.
The diplomatic representation of The Gambia in London changed from a High Commission to an embassy.
The High Commissioner, Mrs. Harding presented her credentials as Ambassador on October 23, 2013.
 The then Ambassador, Francis Blain, became High Commissioner on the 8 February 2018, as The Gambia returned to its membership of the Commonwealth under Adama Barrow, President of the Gambia.

List of representatives

References 

High Commissioners of the Gambia to the United Kingdom
United Kingdom
Gambia the
The Gambia and the Commonwealth of Nations
United Kingdom and the Commonwealth of Nations